The following lists events that happened during 2003 in Ethiopia.

Incumbents
President: Girma Wolde-Giorgis
Prime Minister: Meles Zenawi

Events

January
 January 11 - A drought has spread across the country being one of the worst in the country's history.
 January 24 - The Ethiopian government denies harassing teachers and students opposed to the regime during riots in 2001.

November
 November 18 - The United Nations' World Food Programme has warned that the need for aid in Ethiopia is set to soar.

December
 December 10 - Near the border with Somalia, farmers have been growing khat instead of coffee.

References

 
Years of the 21st century in Ethiopia
2000s in Ethiopia
Ethiopia
Ethiopia